Greshnevo may refer to:

Greshnevo, Moscow Oblast, a village in Moscow Oblast, Russia
Greshnevo, Yaroslavl Oblast, a village in Yaroslavl Oblast, Russia